Cow Springs Ranch is a locale, located in Luna County, New Mexico.  The ranch headquarters is located at Cow Springs, originally Ojo de Vaca.

History 
Ojo de Vaca was a watering place on the old trail between Janos, Chihuahua, Mexico to the Santa Rita copper mines.  When Cooke's Mormon Battalion was searching for a wagon route between the Rio Grande and California, they intercepted the old Mexican road at this spring. From there they followed a course southwestward to Guadalupe Pass and the Janos - Fronteras Road they followed west to the San Pedro River, following it northward before turning west to Mescal Spring and Tucson, pioneering the route known as Cooke's Wagon Road.  By 1849, Cooke's road became the major southern route of the forty-niners during the California Gold Rush and Ojo de Vaca spring was one of the reliable watering places on what became the Southern Emigrant Trail.  Later Ojo de Vaca was a watering place on the San Antonio-San Diego Mail Line.  Subsequently, the Butterfield Overland Mail built Ojo de Vaca Station as a stagecoach station at Ojo de Vaca, in New Mexico Territory.  It was located 14 miles northeast of Soldiers Farewell Station and 16 miles southwest of Miembre's River Station, later Mowry City, New Mexico.  It remained an important stop on this route until the long distance stagecoach lines ended in the late 19th century.

References 

History of Luna County, New Mexico
Geography of Luna County, New Mexico
Springs of New Mexico
Cooke's Wagon Road
San Antonio–San Diego Mail Line
Butterfield Overland Mail in New Mexico Territory
Stagecoach stops in the United States
American frontier
Bodies of water of Luna County, New Mexico